Vanessa Joyce Summers is a Democratic member of the Indiana House of Representatives, representing the 99th District in her native Indianapolis since being appointed to the seat following the death of her father Del. Joseph W. Summers in 1991. Like her father, Vanessa Summers won re-election multiple times, and in 2012 became the first female as well as the first African-American to lead the Indiana House Democratic Caucus.

Background

Her parents had married in 1948, after both her father Joseph W. Summers (1930–1991) and mother Joyce Benson Summers (d. 2014) had graduated from Crispus Attucks High School, when it was the only secondary school open to African Americans in Indianapolis.  Vanessa Summers has a sister (Natalie), and graduated from the former St. Mary's Academy for Girls, then the only private secondary school in the city that would accept African-American pupils (it closed in 1977). Summers attended Indiana University – Purdue University Indianapolis, and in 1981 received an associate degree in mortuary science from the Indiana College of Mortuary Science.

Career

In 1962, when she was an infant, her father had established the Summers Funeral Chapels, and would also serve many years as Indianapolis' deputy coroner. Meanwhile, her mother operated "Lucille's Flowers" for four decades. In 1977, when Vanessa was a teenager, her father won election as a Democrat to the state legislature (a part-time position), and would wim re-election multiple times, representing the 99th district in Indianapolis until his death in 1991.
Vanessa Summers and her sister worked in the family funeral home chain, which merged with other local mortuaries in 2002 and 2016, although "Lavenia & Summers" still operates funeral homes in Indianapolis.

In the Indiana legislature, which was then evenly split between Republicans and Democrats, Summers was appointed to her father's seat for the remaining eight months of the term. Following the advice of Julia Carson, a fellow Indianapolis Democrat (who had served in both houses of the Indiana legislature and would win election to the U.S. Congress), Vanessa Summers ran for election on her own behalf, won and was re-elected multiple times. She faced neither primary nor general election opponents in 2014, 2016 and 2018, and overwhelmingly defeated Republican David T. Blank in 2012, when the Republicans won a legislative majority. Summers is a member of the Indiana Black Legislative Caucus, the National Black Caucus and the Marion County Democratic party.

In addition to her legislative duties, Summers coordinates the national Diabetes Prevention Program in Indianapolis, and has also worked for the Amazing Grace Healthcare Coalition, The ARC of Indiana (a statewide advocacy group for people with intellectual disabilities and their families), and the Julian Center shelter (a domestic violence center).

Personal life

Vanessa Summers is a member of the Alpha Kappa Alpha sorority, the NAACP; and the Light of the World Christian Church. Formerly married, she has a son and granddaughter.

References

External links
Project Vote Smart - Representative Vanessa J. Summers (IN) profile
Follow the Money - Vanessa J Summers 2006 2004 2002 2000 1998 1996 1994 campaign contributions

Democratic Party members of the Indiana House of Representatives
1958 births
Living people
Politicians from Indianapolis
Women state legislators in Indiana
African-American state legislators in Indiana
African-American women in politics
21st-century American politicians
21st-century American women politicians
21st-century African-American women
21st-century African-American politicians
20th-century African-American people
20th-century African-American women